Aliassou Sanou is a Burkina Faso professional footballer who plays as a midfielder for AS SONABEL and the Burkina Faso national football team.

International career
In January 2014, coach Brama Traore, invited him to be a part of the Burkina Faso squad for the 2014 African Nations Championship. The team was eliminated in the group stages after losing to  Uganda and Zimbabwe and then drawing with Morocco.

References

Living people
Burkinabé footballers
2014 African Nations Championship players
Burkina Faso A' international footballers
AS SONABEL players
1988 births
Association football midfielders
21st-century Burkinabé people
Sportspeople from Brazzaville